Atocetus is an extinct genus of pontoporiid dolphin found in Miocene-age marine deposits in Peru and California.

Description 

The type species, Atocetus iquensis, is known from Serravallian-age strata of the Pisco Formation of Peru, while A. nasalis is known from Tortonian-age marine deposits in California. Barnes (1985) originally described the latter as a species of Pithanodelphis, but it was eventually transferred to Atocetus by Muizon (1988). The Miocene delphinidan "Champsodelphis" fuchsii from marine deposits in Austria was initially tentatively referred to Atocetus based on the discovery of partial skeletons from the Carpathian region with earbones similar to those of Atocetus but was eventually re-assigned to Kentriodon following the discovery of additional earbones from Austria and Romania.

Phylogeny 
Although Atocetus and other pithanodelphinines are usually assigned to Kentriodontidae, the cladistic analysis of Lambert et al. (2017) showed that Atocetus and Pithanodelphis form a clade with Tagicetus and Lophocetus that is not only phylogenetically more derived than other kentriodontids but is also phylogenetically intermediate between the baiji and members of Inioidea and Phocoenidae. However, a subsequent cladistic analysis by Post et al. (2017) recovers Atocetus as a member of Pontoporiidae, which includes the franciscana.

References

Bibliography 
 

Prehistoric toothed whales
Prehistoric cetacean genera
Serravallian life
Tortonian life
Miocene mammals of North America
Neogene California
Paleontology in California
Fossils of the United States
Miocene mammals of South America
Laventan
Neogene Peru
Fossils of Peru
Pisco Formation
Fossil taxa described in 1988